Beaudesert was an electoral district of the Legislative Assembly in the Australian state of Queensland from 1991 to 2017.

Beaudesert encompassed rural and semi-urban regions located to the south of the Brisbane metropolitan area. Major communities located within this electoral included Beaudesert, Boonah, Aratula, Jimboomba, Tamborine, Canungra and Rathdowney.

The seat was created at the 1991 redistribution largely from the territory of the abolished seat of Fassifern. It was a safe seat for the National Party, and its successor the Liberal National Party, throughout its entire existence, although former member Aidan McLindon left the LNP in 2010 to form The Queensland Party. He subsequently joined and became state leader of Katter's Australian Party in 2011, but lost his seat in 2012.

The seat was removed in the 2017 electoral redistribution, being replaced (approximately) by the new Scenic Rim.

Members for Beaudesert

Election results

References

External links
 Electorate profile (Antony Green, ABC)

Former electoral districts of Queensland
1992 establishments in Australia
Constituencies established in 1992
2017 disestablishments in Australia
Constituencies disestablished in 2017